Crooked Creek is a stream in Pike and Ralls counties in the U.S. state of Missouri. It is a tributary of the Salt River.

Crooked Creek was so named on account of a few meanders along its course.

See also
List of rivers of Missouri

References

Rivers of Pike County, Missouri
Rivers of Ralls County, Missouri
Rivers of Missouri